The 1954 Gent–Wevelgem was the 16th edition of the Gent–Wevelgem cycle race and was held on 28 March 1954. The race started in Ghent and finished in Wevelgem. The race was won by Rolf Graf.

General classification

References

Gent–Wevelgem
1954 in road cycling
1954 in Belgian sport
March 1954 sports events in Europe